The Butler Bulldogs women's basketball team represents Butler University in Indianapolis, Indiana, United States. The school's team currently competes in the Big East after moving from the Atlantic 10 following the 2012–2013 season. The Bulldogs had competed in the Horizon since joining Division I competition in the 1986–1987 season.  The women’s basketball team began competing in the IAIAW in 1975–1976 under coach Xandra Hamilton and had their first winning season two years later, obtaining a 9–5 record under coach Linda Mason.  The Bulldogs are currently coached by Austin Parkinson.

History
The women's basketball program at Butler University began in the 1975–76 season, competing in the Association for Intercollegiate Athletics for Women (AIAW).  The Bulldogs' first winning season came two years later, earning a 9–5 record under the direction of coach Linda Mason.  The Bulldogs played in the AIAW National Tournament for the first time in 1982, falling in the second round to William Penn, 77–94.  The next season, 1982–83, the Bulldogs began competition at the NCAA Division II level, where they competed for four seasons until they joined the Horizon League and Division I competition for the 1986–87 season.

The Bulldogs qualified for Division I post-season play for the first time in 1993, competing in the WNIT under coach Paulette Stein, who revitalized the program following five losing records in six seasons in the late 1980s.  Butler competed in the NCAA Division I women's basketball tournament for the first time in 1996 under coach June Olkowski, Butler's only coach to never record a losing season.  Their last post-season appearance in the 1990s was in the WNIT in 1998.

The Bulldogs began a new era during the 2002–03 season, in which Beth Couture was hired as the Bulldogs' seventh head coach, a position she still holds.  Couture is Butler's longest-serving head women's basketball coach.  From her first season at Butler through the 2012–2013 season, she compiled a 178–158 record including four total and three consecutive WNIT appearances, and four consecutive 20-win seasons.  Under Couture, Butler recorded a 23–10 mark in 2010, the most wins in team history, and recorded its first WNIT win in 2009 with a 59–58 victory over Duquesne on a layup with 2.2 seconds remaining in the game.

The 2013–14 season will see the Bulldogs' third conference in as many years as Coach Couture guides the team in transitioning to the Big East from its only season in the Atlantic Ten.  During that season, the Bulldogs posted an 8–6 conference record (17–14 overall), giving the team winning records in two conferences during Couture's tenure.

Records

Team

Points
Points in a game:  116 — vs. Detroit, 1/30/99
Points in a season:  2,434 — 1992–93
Points per game:  78.5 — 1992–93
Total points in a game:  217 — Butler (116) vs. Detroit (101), 1/30/99

Rebounds
Rebounds in a game:  68 — vs. Indianapolis, 2/8/83
Rebounds in a season:  1,256 — 1992–93
Rebounds per game:  43.7 — 1982–83

Field goals
Field goals made in a game:  49 — vs. Southern Indiana, 1/28/83
Field goals made in a season:  878 — 1992–93
Field goals attempted in a game:  95 — vs. Southern Indiana, 1/28/83
Field goals attempted in a season:  1,947 — 1992–93
Field goal percentage in a half:  .909 — vs. Vanderbilt, 2nd half (20–22), 11/24/90
Field goal percentage in a game:  .659 — vs. Vanderbilt (31–47), 11/24/90
Field goal percentage in a season:  .480 — 1982–83 (786–1638)
3-point field goals made in a game:  15 — vs. Milwaukee, 2/22/07
3-point field goals made in a season:  260 — 2006–07
3-point field goals attempted in a game:  36 — vs. Green Bay, 1/25/07
3-point field goals attempted in a season:  711 — 2006–07
3-point field goal percentage in a game (min. 10 attempts):  .700 — vs. Loyola (7–10), 1/6/96
3-point field goal percentage in a season:  .393 — 2005–06 (223–567)

Free throws
Free throws made in a game:  42 — vs. Radford, 11/29/97
Free throws made in a season:  659 — 1997–98
Free throws attempted in a game:  50 
vs. UIC, 2/1/96
vs. Radford, 11/29/97
Free throws attempted in a season:  864 — 1997–98
Free throw percentage in a game (min. 10 attempts):  1.000 — vs. Xavier (13–13), 2/23/91
Free throw percentage in a season:  .771— 1998–99 (512–664)

Overall
Wins in a season:  26 — 1980–81 (26–2)
Consecutive victories:  23 — 1978–79

Individual

Single-game
Points:  37
Sarah Bolten vs. Bowling Green, 12/4/01
Elza Purvlicis vs. St. Joseph’s (Ind.), 1/24/84
Rebounds:  26, Elza Purvlicis vs. Indiana Central, 2/8/83
Assists:  14
Melissa Kilgore vs. Marian, 1/14/86
Barb Skinner vs. Wright State, 2/5/83
Field goals made:  16, Elza Purvlicis vs. St. Joseph’s (Ind.), 1/24/84
Field goals attempted:  32, Barb Skinner vs. Dayton, 3/2/83
Field goal percentage (min. 7 made): 1.000
(13–13), Alexis Proffitt vs. Milwaukee, 2/6/97
(11–11), Chloe Hamilton vs. Green Bay, 1/27/11
(8–8), Kelly Kuhn vs. Wright State, 2/20/99
(7–7), Melanie Thornton vs. Cleveland State, 1/14/10
(7–7), Beth Piepenbrink vs. Eastern Illinois, 2/24/83
(7–7), Liesl Schultz vs. Maryland, 12/29/94
3-point field goals made:  7
Jackie Closser at Green Bay, 3/11/07
Jackie Closser vs. Wright State, 2/3/07
Alyssa Pittman at Dayton, 12/21/09
Maria Marchesano vs. Wright State, 2/27/02
3-point field goal attempts:  16, Lisa Pryor vs. Milwaukee, 1/25/03
3-point field goal percentage (min. 4 made):  1.000
(4–4), Ellen Hamilton at Eastern Illinois, 11/30/05
(4–4), Ellen Hamilton vs. Central Florida, 11/25/05
(4–4), Jackie Closser vs. Austin Peay, 11/26/04
(4–4), Maria Marchesano vs. UIC, 2/12/04
(4–4), Jackie Closser vs. UIC, 2/21/04
(4–4), Debbie Benziger vs. Wright State, 2/16/96
(4–4), Sarah Hurrle vs. Milwaukee, 2/6/97
(4–4), Jennifer Marlow vs. Bowling Green, 3/13/98
(4–4), Pam Schiefelbein vs. Detroit, 1/18/88
(4–4), Candace Jones vs. UIC, 1/12/08
Free throws made: 15, Julie VonDielingen vs. Loyola, 2/28/91
Free throw attempts:  20, Lade Akande at Cleveland State, 12/28/06
Free throw percentage (min. 11 made):  1.000
(13–13), Shelley Roby vs. Evansville, 2/20/88
(12–12), Jackie Closser vs. UIC, 3/9/07
(12–12), Jackie Closser at Detroit, 1/18/07
(12–12), Jackie Closser at Detroit, 2/6/06
(12–12), Julie VonDielingen vs. Valparaiso, 12/4/90
(11–11), Kelly Kuhn vs. Cleveland State, 1/28/99
(11–11), Julie VonDielingen vs. Houston, 1/2/93
(11–11), Julie VonDielingen vs. Loyola, 2/6/93
(11–11), Julie VonDielingen vs. Marquette, 2/2/91
Steals:  12, Jenna Cobb vs. Loyola, 2/16/12
Blocked shots:  10, Kelly Kuhn vs. Brown, 12/3/00

Season
Points:  622, Julie VonDielingen, 1992–93
Scoring average:  20.2, Julie VonDielingen, 1990–91
Rebounds:  302, Beth Piepenbrink, 1981–82
Rebounding average:  13.7, Elza Purvlicis, 1983–84
Assists:  195, Melissa Kilgore, 1987–88
Assist average:  7.6, Barb Skinner, 1982–83
Field goals made:  233, Julie VonDielingen, 1992–93
Field goal attempts:  450, Julie VonDielingen, 1992–93
Field goal percentage:  .655 (55–84), Liesl Schultz, 1991–92
3-point field goals made:  85, Jackie Closser, 2006–07
3-point field goal attempts:  227, Jackie Closser, 2006–07
3-point field goal percentage:  .517 (45–87), Jennifer Marlow, 1997–98
Free throws made:  151, Julie VonDielingen, 1990–91
Free throw attempts:  191, Sarah Schuetz, 1997–98
Free throw percentage:  .923 (72–78), Debbie Benziger, 1997–98
Steals:  118, Liz Skinner, 1980–81
Blocked shots:  103, Liesl Schultz, 1994–95
Minutes played:  1,148, Jackie Closser, 2006–07

Career
Points:  2,018, Julie VonDielingen, 1989–93
Scoring average:  18.0, Julie VonDielingen, 1990–93
Rebounds:  1,050, Elza Purvlicis, 1980–84
Rebounding average:  11.4, Elza Purvlicis, 1981–84
Assists:  584, Melissa Kilgore, 1985–88
Assist average:  5.5, Melissa Kilgore, 1985–88
Field goals made:  744, Julie VonDielingen, 1989–93
Field goal attempts:  1,442, Barb Skinner, 1980–83
Field goal percentage:  .600 (404–673), Liesl Schultz, 1992–95
3-point field goals made:  271, Jackie Closser, 2004–07
3-point field goal attempts:  697, Jackie Closser, 2003–07
3-point field goal percentage:  .443 (128–289), Jennifer Marlow, 1995–99
Free throws made:  518, Julie VonDielingen, 1990–93
Free throw attempts:  643, Julie VonDielingen, 1990–93
Free throw percentage:  .841 (280–333), Jackie Closser, 2004–07
Steals:  419, Liz Skinner, 1979–82
Blocked shots:  254, Liesl Schultz, 1992–95
Minutes played:  3,751, Jackie Closser, 2004–07

Postseason

NCAA Division I tournament results
The Bulldogs have appeared in one NCAA tournament. Their record is 0–1.

NCAA Division II tournament results
The Bulldogs made one appearance in the NCAA Division II women's basketball tournament. They had a combined record of 0–1.

NIT results
The Bulldogs have appeared in six Women's National Invitation Tournaments. Their combined record is 5–7.

Awards
Horizon League Women's Basketball Coach of the Year
1989–90 – Paulette Stein
1992–93 – Paulette Stein
1994–95 – June Olkowski
1995–96 – June Olkowski
1997–98 – June Olkowski

Horizon League Women's Basketball Player of the Year
1992–93 – Julie Von Dielingen
1997–98 – Sarah Schuetz
2009–10 – Melanie Thornton

First Team All-League
1989–90 – Julie Von Dielingen
1990–91 – Julie Von Dielingen
1991–92 – Julie Von Dielingen
1992–93 – Julie Von Dielingen
1994–95 – Liesl Schultz
1996–97 – Sarah Schuetz
1997–98 – Jennifer Marlow
1997–98 – Sarah Schuetz
1998–99 – Jennifer Marlow
2003–04 – Nancy Bowden
2005–06 – Jackie Closser
2006–07 – Jackie Closser
2007–08 – Lade Akande
2009–10 – Melanie Thornton
2009–10 – Brigid Mulroy

Second Team All-League
1986–87 – Martha Kondalski
1987–88 – Martha Kondalski
1987–88 – Pam Schiefelbein
1988–89 – Martha Kondalski
1992–93 – Mary Majewski
1993–94 – Liesl Schultz
1995–96 – Debbie Benziger
1996–97 – Jennifer Marlow
1996–97 – Alexis Proffitt
1998–99 – Sarah Hurrle
1999-00 – Kristen Bodine
2000–01 – Kelly Kuhn
2005–06 – Lade Akande
2006–07 – Lade Akande
2010–11 – Chloe Hamilton
2010–11 – Brittany Bowen
2011–12 – Sarah Hamm

Horizon League Women's Basketball Newcomer of the Year
1989–90 – Julie Von Dielingen
1990–91 – Angela Cotton

Horizon League All-Newcomer Team
1989–90 – Mary Majewski
1989–90 – Julie Von Dielingen
1990–91 – Angela Cotton
1991–92 – Lynn Bihn
1995–96 – Jennifer Marlow
1996–97 – Sarah Hurrle
1997–98 – Lori Ives
1998–99 – Kristen Bodine
1998–99 – Kelly Kuhn
1999-00 – Valerie Burg
2001–02 – Maria Marchesano
2003–04 – Ellen Hamilton
2004–05 – Cassie Freeman
2005–06 – Lade Akande
2006–07 – Susan Lester
2009–10 – Alyssa Pittman

Horizon League Tournament MVP
1995–96 – Debbie Benziger

Horizon League All-Tournament Team
1989–90 – Mary Majewski
1989–90 – Shelly Roby
1990–91 – Brandi Kimble
1990–91 – Julie Von Dielingen
1991–92 – Lynn Bihn
1991–92 – Julie Von Dielingen
1992–93 – Mary Majewski
1992–93 – Julie Von Dielingen
1995–96 – Debbie Benziger
1995–96 – Alexis Proffitt
1997–98 – Jennifer Marlow
1997–98 – Sarah Schuetz
2003–04 – Nancy Bowden
2005–06 – Lade Akande
2006–07 – Jackie Closser
2009–10 – Melanie Thornton
2009–10 – Susan Lester
2010–11 – Brittany Bowen

Horizon League Defensive Player of the Year
2009–10 – Melanie Thornton

Horizon League All-Defensive Team
First awarded in 1995–96
1995–96 – Sarah Schuetz
1996–97 – Sarah Schuetz
1997–98 – Sarah Schuetz
1998–99 – Sarah Schuetz
2001–02 – Nancy Bowden
2002–03 – Nancy Bowden
2003–04 – Nancy Bowdrn
2003–04 – Angel Mason
2004–05 – Cortney Urquhart
2008–09 – Melanie Thornton
2009–10 – Melanie Thornton
2011–12 – Jenna Cobb

Notable players
Melani Thornton (Class of 2012) – Plays professionally in Brașov, Romania, for the BC Olimpia Brașov women's basketball team.
Brittany Bowen (Class of 2011) – Played professionally in  Horsens, Denmark, for the Horsens Pirates.
Susan Lester (Class of 2010) – Plays professionally in Edirne, Turkey, for the Edirne Spor women's basketball team.
Courtney Urquhart (Class of 2005) – Played professionally in Martigny, Switzerland, for the Ovronnaz-Martigny women's basketball team.
Angel Mason (Class of 2004) – Played professionally in Reykjavik, Iceland, for team IS.

Yearly records

References

External links